Simplicia bimarginata is a moth of the family Erebidae first described by Francis Walker in 1864. It is found in India, Sri Lanka, Malaysia, Indonesia, New Guinea, Singapore, Sumatra, Borneo, the Philippines and Sulawesi.

Adult wingspan is 18 mm. Forewing greyish with irregular fasciae. Males have the forewing costa slightly concave. There are pale brown hair-pencils in forelegs. Weak antemedial and post-medial line. Hindwing with a similar sub-marginal line.

Gallery

References

Moths of Asia
Moths described in 1891
Herminiinae